Angel Has Fallen is a 2019 American action thriller film directed by Ric Roman Waugh. It is the third installment in the Has Fallen film series, following Olympus Has Fallen (2013) and London Has Fallen (2016). The film stars Gerard Butler, Morgan Freeman, Jada Pinkett Smith, Lance Reddick, Tim Blake Nelson, Piper Perabo, Nick Nolte, and Danny Huston. The plot again follows United States Secret Service agent Mike Banning as he races against time to clear his name after being framed for a drone attack on the President of the United States, Allan Trumbull.

The film was officially announced in October 2016, and Roman Waugh was hired in July 2017. New members of the cast were added in early 2018, and filming began in February of that year around Bulgaria and the United Kingdom.

The film was released in the United States on August 23, 2019, by Lionsgate. It received mixed reviews from critics and grossed $146 million worldwide. Plans for future sequels and TV spin-offs are in development.

Plot
Secret Service agent Mike Banning undergoes training at a military facility in Virginia, owned by his former Army Ranger commanding officer Wade Jennings, now CEO of private military company Salient Global. He is recommended for the position of Secret Service Director by President Allan Trumbull, to replace retiring Director David Gentry, but hides the fact that he suffers from migraines and insomnia and takes painkillers to cope with chronic back pain from previous combat injuries.

While Trumbull is on a private fishing trip at Queen's Lake in Williamsburg, Virginia, a swarm of armed drones attack and overwhelm his protection detail, with only Banning surviving and saving the president. Both are incapacitated, but Banning recovers while Trumbull is left in a coma. FBI agent Helen Thompson is presented with falsified evidence implicating Banning in the attack, leading to his arrest. En route to a detention facility, Banning's transport is ambushed but he escapes after killing the attackers and unmasking them as mercenaries from Salient Global with whom he partook in the training exercise. Realizing that Jennings has betrayed and framed him and is trying to kill him to avoid any possibility of the truth coming out, he calls his wife Leah at a nearby gas station, letting her know he is alive and determined to expose the real perpetrator. The call alerts Thompson to his location, alongside two militia men who have also put a bounty on him, forcing him to steal the militia man's 18-wheeler truck while pursued by many police officers. Banning escapes after crashing the truck and eventually makes his way to his estranged father Clay's off-grid cabin in the backwoods of White Hall, West Virginia.

At the White House, Vice President Martin Kirby, now acting president, tells the press that Banning is responsible for the assassination attempt with support from the Russian government. Banning and his father see Salient mercenaries approaching the house on surveillance cameras. Clay detonates multiple explosives around the perimeter, killing the would-be attackers as he and Banning escape. Banning and his father reconcile, with the latter explaining he left his family to spare them from having to deal with a man with PTSD. They split up; Clay goes to Banning's house and saves Leah and Lynne from a kidnapping attempt by Wade's mercenaries. Finding the bodies of Jennings' gunmen lined up against Clay's cabin, Thompson deduces that Banning was framed. Trumbull awakens from his coma and Kirby is revealed to be Jennings' secret co-conspirator, planning to retaliate for Trumbull's "attempted assassination" by declaring Cold War II. Thompson and another agent Ramirez confront Jennings on an airfield, but Jennings kills them both.

Banning reaches the hospital and gives himself up. Trumbull orders his release when he realizes that the Salient mercenaries are attempting to kill him and only Banning can keep him alive. Banning leads Trumbull to safety with help from Gentry and other loyal agents as Jennings's mercenaries increase the hospital's ICU's oxygen and nitrogen supply to unstable levels, causing an explosion that levels the hospital. Banning hides Trumbull and Gentry as Jennings' men pursue them. In an extended gun battle, Salient Global kills most of Trumbull's security detail, but Banning thwarts a flanking attempt and forces the mercenaries to retreat after they are delayed long enough to allow government reinforcements to arrive. The survivors, led by Jennings, are gathering on the rooftop to escape in a helicopter but Banning blows it up with a grenade launcher. However, Jennings manages to survive the explosion, but Banning fatally wounds him in a knife fight. The rest of Jennings' men are either killed in the firefight or arrested by U.S. federal law enforcement officers.

Banning is exonerated while Trumbull and Gentry arrest Kirby for treason and corruption, revealing that Jennings had kept detailed records of Kirby's involvement, as an insurance policy, and which was uncovered by Thompson before she was killed. Clay decides to live with Banning and his family. Feeling guilty over his failure to protect Trumbull and concealing his ailments, Banning offers his resignation, but Trumbull forgives him and offers Banning the promotion to Director of the Secret Service, which he proudly accepts.

Cast
 Gerard Butler as Secret Service Agent Mike Banning, a former Army Ranger, Clay's son and Leah's husband.
 Morgan Freeman as President Allan Trumbull, the former Speaker of the House, Vice President, and now the current President of the United States, succeeding Benjamin Asher who was portrayed by Aaron Eckhart in the first two films
 Jada Pinkett Smith as FBI Agent Helen Thompson, an FBI Special Agent tasked with arresting and hunting down Mike Banning, believing him to be responsible for the drone attack against the President
 Lance Reddick as Secret Service Director David Gentry
 Tim Blake Nelson as Vice President Martin Kirby, the new Vice President who eventually becomes the acting President of the United States, revealed to have secretly hired Salient Global to carry out the drone attack so they can blame and attack Russia.
 Piper Perabo as Leah Banning, Mike's wife. Perabo replaced Radha Mitchell, who played the role in the previous films, due to Mitchell's scheduling conflicts.
 Nick Nolte as Clay Banning, a Vietnam veteran Army Ranger/Tunnel Rat and Mike's estranged father who abandoned him at a young age. Since then, he has taken up living in the woods all over the U.S.
 Danny Huston as Wade Jennings, Mike's former Ranger commanding officer and the leader of Salient Global.
 Frederick Schmidt as Travis Cole, head of security of Salient Global and Jennings' right-hand man.
 Michael Landes as White House Chief of Staff Sam Wilcox
 Joseph Millson as FBI Agent Ramirez
 Ori Pfeffer as Secret Service Agent Murphy
 Mark Arnold as CIA Director James Haskell
 Chris Browning as Militia man
 Jessica Cobley as Lynne Banning, Mike and Leah's daughter
 Rocci Williams as Bruno, one of Jennings' soldiers
 Antonio Bustorff as one of the mercenaries sent to kidnap Leah Banning.

Production
On October 28, 2016, it was announced that a third Fallen installment, titled Angel Has Fallen, was in development, with Gerard Butler reprising his roles of both lead actor and producer. On July 25, 2017, Ric Roman Waugh was announced as director.

On January 10, 2018, Holt McCallany was set to play Wade Jennings, an ex-military turned head of a technology company. However, he later had to drop out of his role due to scheduling conflicts with the show Mindhunter, and was replaced by Danny Huston. A week later, Jada Pinkett Smith and Tim Blake Nelson were confirmed added, and filming was scheduled to start on February 7, 2018. On February 13, 2018, Piper Perabo joined the cast. On March 12, 2018, Lance Reddick was set to play Secret Service Director Gentry. Aaron Eckhart, who had played president Benjamin Asher in the first two films, announced he would not return in his role. On March 21, 2018, Michael Landes was cast as White House Chief of Staff Sam Wilcox. On January 22, 2019, David Buckley was announced as the film's composer, replacing Trevor Morris, who scored the previous two films.

Filming on Angel Has Fallen commenced at Virginia Water Lake, and continued throughout the United Kingdom and Bulgaria. Filming also took place at Pinewood Studios, Bray Studios, Longcross Studios and Nu Boyana Film Studios.

Release
The film was released in the United States on August 23, 2019.

Reception

Box office
Angel Has Fallen grossed $69 million in the United States and Canada, and $77.6 million in other territories, for a worldwide total of $146.7 million.

In the United States and Canada, the film was released alongside Overcomer and was projected to gross $13–15 million from 3,286 theaters in its opening weekend. It made $7.9 million on its first day. This included $1.5 million from Thursday night previews, the highest of the series. It went on to debut to $21.3 million, finishing first and over-performing. It was Butler's first time atop the box office since 300 (2007), and was just below the opening of London Has Fallen ($21.6 million). The film remained in first place the following weekend, grossing $11.8 million, as well as $3 million on Labor Day. The film was finally dethroned in its third weekend, grossing $6 million and finishing second, behind newcomer It Chapter Two.

Critical response
The website's critical consensus reads: "Cut from the same rough cloth as its predecessors, Angel Has Fallen rounds out a mostly forgettable action trilogy in fittingly mediocre fashion." On Metacritic, the film has a weighted average score of 45 out of 100, based on 33 critics, indicating "mixed or average reviews". Audiences polled by CinemaScore gave the film an average grade of "A−" on an A+ to F scale, the same score earned by its predecessors, while those at PostTrak gave it an average 4.5 out of 5 stars and a 64% "definite recommend".

Todd McCarthy of The Hollywood Reporter wrote that the film, "may not be appreciably better than the first two installments ..., but it's actually more fun — first and foremost because of a vastly amusing turn by Nick Nolte as Gerard Butler's eccentric Vietnam vet old coot father." Ignatiy Vishnevetsky of The A.V. Club gave the film a grade C, and called it a "dramatic improvement" though was critical of the action sequences, saying, "they all fall victim to having too much repetitive editing and not enough kinetic energy, a problem that no amount of onscreen firepower, twisted wreckage, or offbeat overhead camera angles can solve." David Ehrlich of IndieWire gave the film a "D+", specifying that "[w]ith Nolte as his bonkers dad, Gerard Butler's mediocre action franchise and his mediocre American accent find a mediocre conclusion."

Future
In November 2019, series producer Alan Siegel announced plans for a fourth, fifth and sixth film, as well as local-language TV spin-offs that would tie-in with the theatrical features. In November 2020 it was revealed at the American Film Market that a fourth film was in development with Butler returning titled Night Has Fallen.

See also
 Olympus Has Fallen
 London Has Fallen
 List of films featuring drones

References

External links
 
 

2019 action thriller films
2019 films
2010s action thriller films
American action thriller films
American sequel films
2010s English-language films
Films about fictional presidents of the United States
Films about terrorism in the United States
Films shot at Nu Boyana Film Studios
Films shot in the United Kingdom
Films set in hospitals
Lionsgate films
Techno-thriller films
Films shot at Pinewood Studios
Has Fallen
Films directed by Ric Roman Waugh
Films scored by David Buckley
Films with screenplays by Robert Mark Kamen
Drone films
Films about the Central Intelligence Agency
Films about the United States Secret Service
2010s American films